Gallagher Group started as a civil engineering and groundworks contractor. Then operated civil engineering, property development, 'design and build' contracting and quarrying businesses.

History
Pat Gallagher (the chairman of Gallagher) was born in County Leitrim, Ireland (as part of a grocer family). The family and Pat (aged 17) left Ireland and moved to the village of Aylesford to live with his aunt. Pat started working for Jubilee Clips in Gilingham before going to work with Aylesford Sewage works. His father Patrick was killed after falling into a tank. After her husband's death, his mother moved back to Ireland. He decided to stay in Kent. He then drove a digger for builder Pat Burke, now his best friend, who advised him there was enough work for everyone. The young Gallagher bought that digger for £2000 and that started his construction career.  
Three of his four children – Stephen, Richard and Lyndsey – are also involved in the business.

Business
Gallagher Group has a unique mix of distinct but complementary services
 Building (including foundations) 
 Civil engineering
 Plant and Transport
 Construction materials (primary and recycled)
 Kentish Ragstone building stone
 Ready-mix concrete and flowing screed
 Landfill and restoration
 Property development
 Farming and estate management

Known Projects
 Scania Maidstone Depot
 Nepicar Park, Wrotham
 Rainham Mark Grammar School
Spires Academy
Maidstone United F.C.’s Gallagher Stadium
Kent Institute of Medicine and Surgery
Eclipse Park (office park near Maidstone)
Mote Park
Hermitage Court, Barming
Hermitage Quarry
Eureka Skyway (pedestrian bridge over M20 near Ashford)

Charities
Heart of Kent Hospice, Preston Hall, Royal British Legion Village, Aylesford

References

External links

Housebuilding companies of the United Kingdom
Construction and civil engineering companies established in 1973
Companies based in Kent
1973 establishments in England